Viewbank is a suburb of Melbourne, Victoria, Australia, 14 km north-east of Melbourne's Central Business District, located within the City of Banyule local government area.

The area now known as Viewbank is on the traditional lands of the Wurundjeri people. The Birrarung (Yarra River) and large tracts of the Yarra Valley Parkland run along one border of the suburb. The Plenty River forms Viewbank's eastern boundary, whilst its northern boundary is defined by Lower Plenty Road (a main road linking Heidelberg and Eltham).  Although mainly a residential area, there is a small commercial strip on Martins Lane adjacent to Viewbank Primary School.

Past and present

Wurrundjeri are the traditional owners of the land
The traditional owners of the land where Viewbank is are the Wurundjeri. Settlement and dispossession of the Wurundjeri lands began soon after a ceremony in which Wurundjeri leaders conducted a tanderrum ceremony, whose function was to allow outsiders temporary access to the resources of clan lands.

Viewbank Homestead

After a millennia of living in the area, the Wurundjeri were displaced and Viewbank was settled by Edward Willis in 1837 and was named after the homestead property built at the junction of the Yarra River and Plenty River constructed in 1839 by pastoralist James Williamson. It was later added to by Dr. Robert Martin. It was owned by the Bartram family 1922-1974 who operated the property as a dairy. The homestead was demolished in the 1920s after the house had fallen into disrepair. Local residents believed it was haunted..

Between 1996 and 1999 Heritage Victoria conducted excavations at the site with the help of archaeologists from University of Melbourne, La Trobe University and Flinders University with more than 140 archaeology students and members of the community.  Stone foundations of the house with remnants of hand-made brick walls, fireplaces and other features were uncovered.  Artefacts including toys, game tokens, thimbles and pins were found. Articles of affluence were also found in the form of a network of servant's bells, fragments of marble fireplaces and decorated plaster cornices were also uncovered.

Remnants of Viewbank's farming past can be seen from the historic silos still standing on Banyule Road. The site is recognised as having historical and archaeological significance to the State of Victoria, and is listed on the Victorian Heritage Database.

Other history
Mollison Lodge at 32 Old Lower Plenty Road was built in 1916. It is considered a good example of the Federation Bungalow style, and is enhanced by its mature garden setting.  Few pastoral or agricultural buildings survive from the early 20th century, with Mollison Lodge being one of the important exceptions.

There were many rural allotments along the Yarra River, of which the house at 7 Walker Court appears to be an example, making it of local historical significance. The building is one of the few houses dating from the 19th century remaining in the area, and appears in an early painting.

The area was primarily developed around the 1960s. Viewbank Post Office opened on 1 October 1962 and was renamed Banyule in 1969.

Located near The Silo, the famous Flécher Cottage was named after Fletcher Brown.
 
Several new housing developments were built during the 1990s and 2000s, including the end of Martins Lane, Winston Hills and Eagle View (on Casey Crescent).

Facilities
There are very few facilities in Viewbank. The nearest libraries are at Rosanna and Eltham. The nearest pools are in Ivanhoe, Eltham and Heidelberg - all about a 15 to 20 minute drive away. The closest train station, Rosanna Station, is a 10 minute drive away with limited parking or a 40 minute walk. There are no cafes or places to dine in Viewbank.

Parks and wetlands

Banyule Flats Reserve encompasses a large wetland of over 46 acres and is considered the largest grassy woodland in inner Melbourne.
Castleton Park
Price Park
Viewbank Reserve

Education

 Viewbank Primary School is located in Nevin Parade, Rosanna East. It opened in 1966 with a staff of six and an enrolment of 97 pupils ranging from beginners to Grade six. It was not until 1968 when the enrolment rose to 285 pupils, that the school was officially opened. By this time extensive works had taken place on the 5.8 acre property including sealed areas, drainage, reticulation of water, concrete paths and garden beds with concrete edging.
Viewbank College (formerly Rosanna East High School, merging with Banyule High School in 1994).

Notable residents
In the 1980s, Australian Aerial Freestyle Olympic Gold Medallist Alisa Camplin and Australian Olympic Runner Tamsyn Manou all attended Viewbank Primary School.

Climate

See also
 City of Heidelberg – Viewbank was previously within this former local government area.

References

External links
Australian Places – Viewbank
Viewbank, Heidelberg (Williamson family history) via Wikinorthia
Good taste, fashion, luxury: a genteel Melbourne family and their rubbish by Sarah C. Hayes  

Suburbs of Melbourne
Suburbs of the City of Banyule